Lysvatnet is the name of several lakes in Norway:

Lysvatnet (Lenvik), in Lenvik municipality in Troms county
Lysvatnet (Meløy), in Meløy municipality in Nordland county
Lysvatnet (Verran), in Verran municipality in Trøndelag county